Austropugetia is a genus of marine red alga. It is monotypic, containing only the species Austropugetia crassa.

References

External links
AlgaeBase

Kallymeniaceae
Taxa described in 2009
Monotypic algae genera
Red algae genera